Sri Lanka School of Military Engineering is located at Embilipitiya, Sri Lanka. Established as the Ceylon School of Military Engineering in 1958 by the Ceylon Army it provides a wide range of training for the Sri Lanka Engineers including combat engineering, bomb disposal and heavy plant operations.

Training
Field engineer courses I, II, III 
Bomb disposal course
Heavy plant operators course I, II, III
Assault pioneer course
Watermanship course
Recruit course
Humanitarian demining training programme
L/cpl to cpl promotion course
Introduction to explosive course for navy
Basic and Advanced CBRN Course to army and navy

References

External links 
HQ SSME website

Sri Lanka Engineers
Training establishments of the Sri Lanka Army
1958 establishments in Ceylon
Engineering universities and colleges in Sri Lanka